Smolenskaerotrans is a charter airline based in Smolensk, Russia which specialises in aerial work but also carries cargo

Fleet

References

Airlines of Russia
Companies based in Smolensk Oblast